Adjodha Persaud (born 7 August 1949) is a Guyanese cricketer. He played in 28 first-class matches for Guyana from 1971 to 1978.

See also
 List of Guyanese representative cricketers

References

External links
 

1949 births
Living people
Guyanese cricketers
Guyana cricketers